The Great Mosque of Niono is an architecturally significant mosque located in the city of Niono, in the Ségou Region of southern Mali. It is a Sudano-Sahelian architectural style building made mostly of mud brick, palm tree wood, and clay mortar.

Site description
The mosque was first constructed in 1948 by a team of bricklayers native to Djenne led by Lassiné Minta. To accommodate the growing population of Niono, it was given a few major expansions, the last of which was completed in 1973. Today, it occupies 1,800 square meters and includes a main room that spans 658 square meters and a women's prayer hall that spans two floors. It has a main minaret by the west entrance and three additional minarets on the east end along the qibla wall. The mosque has a hypostyle design with a total 68 pillars on the inside. 

It is perhaps the most internationally recognized site in the town of Niono, having received the Aga Khan Award for Architecture in 1983.

World Heritage Status
This site was added to the UNESCO World Heritage Tentative List on March 19, 2009 in the Cultural category.

References

Malian culture
Mosques completed in 1948
Niono
Mosques in Mali
Sudano-Sahelian architecture